The 1997–98 EHF Women's Cup Winners' Cup was the twenty-third edition of EHF's competition for women's handball national cup champions. It ran from October 3, 1998, to May 15, 1999.

Defending champion Bækkelagets SK won again the competition, beating Ferrobús Tortajada in the final. For the first time in the Cup Winners' Cup's history no team from the former Eastern Bloc or former Yugoslavia reached the final.

Results

References

Women's EHF Cup Winners' Cup
1998 in handball
1999 in handball